Giuliana Amici (24 February 1952) is a former Italian javelin thrower, later became masters athlete.

Biography
Giuliana Amici won nine (consecutive years from 1970 to 1978) national championships at senior level. She also competed at the 1974 European Championships and 1978 European Championships. After her senior career she did not abandon the competitive sport, so to continue in the masters athletics and won the gold medal at the 2007 World Masters Championships held in Riccione.

National records
In her career she has set 9 senior national records, from 1970 to 1997, the last of which was broken by Fausta Quintavalla.
 Javelin throw: 56.26 m ( Ravenna, 2 July 1977) - holder till 30 August 1977

Personal best
 Javelin throw: 58.72 m ( Rome, 26 July 1978)

Achievements
Masters

National titles
Italian Athletics Championships
Javelin throw: 1970, 1971, 1972, 1973, 1974, 1975, 1976, 1977, 1978

References

External links
 
 Giuliana Amici at All-Athletics

1952 births
Living people
Italian female javelin throwers
Italian masters athletes